Slayers: The Motion Picture (スレイヤーズ～THE MOTION PICTURE) is an original soundtrack from the 1995 anime film of the same title. It was released in Japan in 1995 and in the United States in 2003.

The CD features all the background music and songs from the movie. It was composed by Takayuki Hattori (primarily), Akira Odakura, Shō Goshima and Hidetoshi Satō, arranged by Hattori and Goshima, and directed by Katsuyoshi Kobayashi. The vocal tracks with the lyrics written by Fumie Nazakawa and Satomi Arimori were performed by Megumi Hayashibara and Maria Kawamura.

Release
It was originally released in Japan by King Records on September 9, 1995 (KICA-254) and was released in North America by A.D. Vision (ADV Music) on July 1, 2003 (UPC: 702727036323). ADV also released the soundtrack for Slayers Return.

The North American ADV release comes with a 14-page insert guide, including a five-page essay "The Wonderful World of Takayuki Hattori's Music" about the film's music and the inspirations behind it (illustrated with SD style character pictures), four pages of character sketches, and a comic strip. Tiffani Nadeau of Mania.com gave it a perfect score of 5/5.

The film's theme song "Midnight Blue" was released as a single CD Midnight Blue (KIDA-108) by Starchild Records on July 21, 1995, and included in Megumi Hayashibara's 1996 album bertemu. The songs were also later included in the CD collection The Best of Slayers Vol. 2 (From OVA, Movie & Game).

Track list

References

External links

1995 soundtrack albums
Anime soundtracks
Slayers
Fantasy film soundtracks
Adventure film soundtracks